A Fortune Hunter (Swedish: En lyckoriddare) is a 1921 Swedish silent historical drama film directed by John W. Brunius and starring Gösta Ekman,  Mary Johnson and Axel Ringvall. Future star Greta Garbo appeared in a small role as a maid at a tavern. The film's sets were designed by the art directors Gustaf Hallén and Vilhelm Bryde. It is now considered a lost film.

Cast
 Gösta Ekman as 	Lars Wiwalt
 Mary Johnson as 	Gertrud Wulffsdotter
 Axel Ringvall as 	Wulff Grijp
 Hilda Forsslund as 	Lena Daa
 Nils Lundell as 	Clement
 Vilhelm Bryde as Rönnow Bilde
 Gösta Cederlund as 	Niels Kagg
 Gull Natorp as 	Mrs. Margarete Grijp
 Carlo Keil-Möller as 	Erich Gyllenstierna
 Arthur Natorp as 	Andreas Anundi
 Semmy Friedmann as 	Henri de Bresignac
 Greta Garbo as 	Maid
 Alva Garbo as 	Girl in Tavern
 Alfred Lundberg as Priest

References

Bibliography
 Gustafsson, Tommy. Masculinity in the Golden Age of Swedish Cinema: A Cultural Analysis of 1920s Films. McFarland, 2014.
 Sadoul, Georges. Dictionary of Film Makers. University of California Press, 1972.

External links

1921 films
1921 drama films
Swedish silent feature films
Swedish black-and-white films
Films directed by John W. Brunius
1920s Swedish-language films
Swedish historical drama films
1920s historical drama films
Films set in the 17th century
Silent historical drama films
1920s Swedish films